Diocese of Oca may refer to the following ecclesiastical jurisdictions :

 the former Diocese of Oca (Asia Minor) in present Asian Turkey, now a Latin Catholic titular see
 the former Roman Catholic Diocese of Auca (Curiate name; Spanish Oca, modern Villafranca Montes de Oca), now also a Latin Catholic titular see

See also 
 Oca (disambiguation) for secular namesakes